The following lists events that happened during the year 2011 in Bosnia and Herzegovina.

Incumbents
Presidency:
Bakir Izetbegović 
Željko Komšić
Nebojša Radmanović
Prime Minister: Nikola Špirić 

 
Years of the 21st century in Bosnia and Herzegovina
2010s in Bosnia and Herzegovina
Bosnia and Herzegovina
Bosnia and Herzegovina